Paratrichodorus  is a genus of terrestrial root feeding (stubby-root) nematodes in the Trichodoridae family (trichorids), being one of five genera. They are economically important plant parasites and virus vectors. The females are didelphic (two genital tracts), and are distributed worldwide.

Taxonomy 
Historically, Trichodorus formed the only genus in the Trichodoridae family. Then Trichodorus was split into two genera in 1974 by Siddiqi, Trichodorus and Paratrichodorus. The genus, which is the second largest in the family consists of 34 species.  Siddiqi based the separation on the position of the gland nuclei and the type of pharyngo-intestinal junction.

Subdivision 
Using the same characteristics as those establishing the genus, Siddiqi described three subgenera, Paratrichodorus, Atlantadorus and Nanidorus, but Decraemer did not support the validity of this. While the latter approach has not been accepted by some authorities, Siddiqi elevated them to genus status in 1980, an approach that few other authors have followed, but maintained by that author,<ref>{{cite journal | last1 = Siddiqi | first1 = M.R. | year = 2002 | title = Ecuadorus equatorius gen. n., sp. and Nanidorus mexicanus sp. n. (Nematoda: Trichodoridae) | journal = International Journal of Nematology | volume = 12 | pages = 197–202 }}</ref> and now receiving some support from modern molecular approaches to taxonomy. At least in the case of Nanidorus, phylogenetic analysis has supported its recognition as a separate genus, although clustering with Trichodorus rather than its parent Paratrichodorus.

 Plant pathology 
Trichorids became of interest in 1951. At that time Trichodorus christie (=Paratrichodorus minor'') was recognised as a pest of crops in Florida.

References

Bibliography 

De Ley, P & Blaxter, M 2004, 'A new system for Nematoda: combining morphological characters with molecular trees, and translating clades into ranks and taxa'. in R Cook & DJ Hunt (eds), Nematology Monographs and Perspectives. vol. 2, E.J. Brill, Leiden, pp. 633–653.

DECRAEMER, W. & BAUJARD, P., 1998. Additions and corrections to: Decraemer: The Family Trichodoridae.  Fundamental and Applied Nematology 21 (2): 207-212.

Enoplea genera